The 2004 Giro d'Italia was the 87th edition of the Giro d'Italia, one of cycling's Grand Tours. The Giro began in Genoa, with a Prologue individual time trial on 8 May, and Stage 11 occurred on 20 May with a stage from Porto Sant'Elpidio. The race finished in Milan on 30 May.

Stage 11
20 May 2004 — Porto Sant'Elpidio to Cesena,

Stage 12
21 May 2004 — Cesena to Treviso,

Stage 13
22 May 2004 — Trieste to Trieste,  (ITT)

Stage 14
23 May 2004 — Trieste to Pula,

Stage 15
24 May 2004 — Poreč to San Vendemiano,

Stage 16
25 May 2004 — San Vendemiano to Pfalzen,

Rest day
26 May 2004

Stage 17
27 May 2004 — Bruneck to Fondo/Sarnonico,

Stage 18
28 May 2004 — Cles to Bormio 2000,

Stage 19
29 May 2004 — Bormio to Presolana,

Stage 20
30 May 2004 — Clusone to Milan,

References

2004 Giro d'Italia
Giro d'Italia stages